Layton is a city in Davis County, Utah, United States. It is part of the Ogden-Clearfield Metropolitan Statistical Area. As of the 2020 census, the city had a population of 81,773, with 2022 estimates showing a slight increase to 84,665. Layton is the most populous city in Davis County and the ninth most populous in Utah.
 
Layton has direct access to Salt Lake City, Ogden, Salt Lake City International Airport, Antelope Island, and the FrontRunner commuter rail. Layton City is a leader in economic development for the region, with immediate adjacency to Hill Air Force Base, a large hospitality district (1,000+ hotel beds) and conference center, the Layton Hills Mall, multiple nationally recognized retail and food chains, the East Gate Business Park, and the Weber State University-Davis campus.

In 2014, Layton contributed $1.34 billion worth of retail sales activity, the second largest market north of Salt Lake City and seventh largest in Utah.

History

Founding
Layton was settled in the 1850s as an outgrowth of Kaysville and is named after Christopher Layton, a Latter-day Saint settler and leader. It was included in the boundaries when Kaysville was incorporated as a city in 1868, but by the 1880s, many Layton residents wanted to separate from the city. They challenged Kaysville's authority to tax their property, claiming they received no municipal services. This dispute reached the United States Supreme Court in 1894 as the case of Linford v. Ellison, which was decided in favor of the Layton property owners. The separatist movement finally succeeded in 1902, when Layton became an independent unincorporated area. After further growth, it was made an incorporated town in 1920.

Expansion
The town's population increased slowly; up until 1940 it was about 600. The creation of Hill Air Force Base to the north in 1940, followed shortly by the United States' entry into World War II, led to a dramatic population increase. War workers streamed into the area; the 1950 census counted 3,456 people. Layton became a city, transformed from a farming town to a residential community. Growth slowed after the war, but Layton continued to develop as a suburban bedroom community, as those not employed at the Air Force base began commuting to the Salt Lake City or Ogden areas. The city continued to expand geographically, annexing surrounding parcels of land, including the adjacent town of Laytona and city of East Layton. In 1985, Layton passed Bountiful to become the most populous city in Davis County.

Geography
It is bordered by Clearfield to the northwest, Hill Air Force Base to the north, South Weber to the northeast, the Wasatch Mountains to the east, Kaysville to the south, Great Salt Lake wetlands to the southwest and Syracuse to the west.

Climate
The climate in this area is characterized by hot summers and cold winters. Great Salt Lake effect snow is common in the winter.

Demographics

As of the census of 2010, there were 67,311 people, 18,282 households, and 14,771 families residing in the city. The population density was 2,823.9 people per square mile (1,090.1/km2). There were 19,145 housing units at an average density of 924.6 per square mile (356.9/km2). The racial makeup of the city was 89.91% White, 1.61% African American, 0.53% Native American, 2.08% Asian, 0.27% Pacific Islander, 3.09% from other races, and 2.52% from two or more races. Hispanic or Latino of any race were 6.96% of the population.

There were 18,282 households, out of which 48.9% had children under the age of 18 living with them, 67.4% were married couples living together, 9.7% had a female householder with no husband present, and 19.2% were non-families. 15.2% of all households were made up of individuals, and 3.5% had someone living alone who was 65 years of age or older. The average household size was 3.19 and the average family size was 3.59.

Population was 35.1% under the age of 18, 12.1% from 18 to 24, 30.3% from 25 to 44, 16.8% from 45 to 64, and 5.7% who were 65 years of age or older. The median age was 27 years. For every 100 females, there were 101.7 males. For every 100 females age 18 and over, there were 100.1 males.

The median income for a household was $52,128, and the median income for a family was $57,193. Males had a median income of $40,409 versus $26,646 for females. The per capita income for the city was $19,604. About 5.0% of families and 5.6% of the population were below the poverty line, including 7.0% of those under age 18 and 4.0% of those age 65 or over.

Government
Layton City has a council/manager form of government with 290 full-time employees. The Layton City Council is composed of five members and a mayor. All members are elected by the residents of the City during a municipal election held every two years. Each seat consists of a four-year term. Council member terms are staggered. Two members and a mayor are elected at one time, and two years later the other three members are elected. The Mayor and Council are responsible for setting city policy and the City Manager is responsible for the day-to-day operations.

Joy Petro became mayor in 2019 and Alex R. Jensen has been the city manager since 1992. There are five city council members. , the city council members are Tom Day (since 2013), Dawn Fitzpatrick (since 2020), Clint Morris (since 2019), Dave Thomas (since 2019), and Zach Bloxham (since 2019). City council meetings are held every first and third Thursday at 7:00 PM in the council chambers.

Education
Layton has an extended branch of Weber State University and is part of Davis School District. The city has three high schools, five junior high schools, and fourteen elementary schools.

High schools
 Layton High School (est. 1966) - Davis School District
 Northridge High School (est. 1992) - Davis School District
 NUAMES—Northern Utah Academy of Math, Engineering & Science (est 2004) - an early college charter high school that works in partnership with Weber State University.

Junior high schools
 Central Davis Junior High
 Legacy Junior High
 North Davis Preparatory Academy Junior High 
 North Layton Junior High
 Shoreline Junior high

Elementary schools
 Sarah Jane Adams Elementary
 Crestview Elementary
 Ellison Park Elementary
 East Layton Elementary
 Heritage Elementary
 E.G. King Elementary
 Layton Elementary
 Lincoln Elementary
 Mountain View Elementary
 North Davis Preparatory Academy Elementary
 Sand Springs Elementary
 Sunburst Elementary
 Vae View Elementary
 E. M. Whitesides Elementary

Transportation
I-15 runs north–south through the center of town and serves Layton with three interchanges - (from north to south) Antelope Drive, Hillfield Road, and Layton Parkway. U.S. 89 runs north–south along the eastern edge of Layton, adjacent to the western slope of the Wasatch Mountains, and provides access to Weber Canyon via I-84 to the north in South Weber, then merges with I-15 and Legacy Parkway to the south in Farmington, near Lagoon Amusement Park. Utah State Route 193 runs east–west through northern Layton, past the south gate of Hill Air Force Base, connecting U.S. 89 to I-15 in Clearfield.

Utah Transit Authority (UTA) provides bus service and FrontRunner commuter rail. FrontRunner's Layton Station is located at the site of the former Union Pacific Layton Depot.

Points of interest
Layton's major retail district includes the Layton Hills Mall, Cinemark and AMC movie theaters, Davis Conference Center, and "Restaurant Row", nicknamed such due to the large number of national chain restaurants located along its one-mile stretch.

Layton's City Center includes the city offices, police station, and courthouse. Located nearby are Layton Commons Park, Davis Arts Council, Davis County Library Central Branch, Edward A Kenley Centennial Amphitheater, Heritage Museum of Layton, Layton Surf 'N Swim, and Layton High School.

Adams Canyon, a popular hiking destination, is located east of Highway 89. Gambel Oak, Douglas Fir, and Fern Bush are a few plant species found along the trail. Chipmunks and various types of birds can also be found. The trail head is located at N Eastside Dr, East Layton, UT 84040. The total length is approximately  out and back.

On April 1, 2018, Russell M. Nelson, president of the Church of Jesus Christ of Latter-day Saints, announced the church's intention to build a temple in Layton.  At the time of its announcement, the Layton Utah Temple would become the 19th in Utah. The temple site is located at 1400 E Oak Hills Dr, Layton, UT 84040. All construction is projected to complete in 2023.

Parks and trails
 Andy Adams Park 1713 E 1000 N
 Bamberger Trail
 Camelot Park 1400 W 2000 N
 Chapel Park 152 S 900 E
 Chelsie Meadows Park 1401 N 2575 W
 D&RG Trail
 Ellison Park - Splash Pad & Skate Park   700 N 2200 W
 Grey Hawk Park, 3500 Redtail Way
 Kays Creek Parkway Multiple Trail Heads
 Layton Commons Park 437 N Wasatch Dr
 Legacy Park 469 N 3200 W
 Oak Forest Park 2250 E 2400 N
 Sandridge Park 2555 N Church St
 Vae View Park 1600 N Main
 Veterans Park 175 W Gentile St
 Woodward Park 1505 N 25 E

Notable people
 Julian Blackmon, NFL player
 Christine Cavanaugh, voice actress known for Babe
 Daniel Coats, former NFL player for the Cincinnati Bengals
 John Collins, basketball player, first-round selection in 2017 NBA draft
 Tiffany Coyne, model on Let's Make a Deal
 Chuck Ehin, NFL player
 Sherman L. Fleek, military historian
 Kevin Garn, former majority leader of the Utah House of Representatives
 Dayan Lake, NFL player
 Shaun Todd McBride, artist and social media personality best known as Shonduras
 Court McGee, a mixed martial artist currently fighting in UFC
 Ruby Timms Price, first Black teacher in Utah
 Sterling W. Sill, a general authority for the Church of Jesus Christ of Latter-day Saints and local businessman
 Calvin Lee Vail, better known as LeafyIsHere or just Leafy; YouTube personality and critic
 YoungBoy Never Broke Again, rapper who currently resides in Layton due to ongoing legal issues

Local Acts 
 Get Scared, heavy metal band from Layton

See also

 List of cities and towns in Utah

References

Further reading

External links

 

 
Cities in Utah
Cities in Davis County, Utah
Wasatch Front
Ogden–Clearfield metropolitan area
Populated places established in the 1850s